Wareham Island is an uninhabited island in the Qikiqtaaluk Region of Nunavut, Canada. It is located in the Cumberland Sound, off Baffin Island's Cumberland Peninsula, southwest of the mouth of Kumlien Fiord. Akulagok Island, Kekerten Island, Kekertukdjuak Island, Miliakdjuin Island, Tesseralik Island, and Tuapait Island are in the vicinity.

History
Dr. Franz Boas made an ethnographical trip to this region in 1883.

References

External links 
 Wareham Island in the Atlas of Canada - Toporama; Natural Resources Canada

Islands of Baffin Island
Islands of Cumberland Sound
Uninhabited islands of Qikiqtaaluk Region